Vibhor Yadav (born 28 March 1991) is an English cricketer. He made his first-class debut for Sri Lanka Police Sports Club in Tier B of the 2017–18 Premier League Tournament on 21 December 2017.

References

External links
 

1991 births
Living people
English cricketers
Sri Lanka Police Sports Club cricketers
Sportspeople from Noida